Alison Marie Tetrick (born April 4, 1985) is an American racing cyclist. She rode at the 2014 UCI Road World Championships.

Tetrick comes from a sporting family – her grandfather, Paul Tetrick, won more than a dozen national time trial titles, whilst her father played American football for UCLA and subsequently competed in mountain biking. Alison competed as a tennis player whilst at college, becoming an All-American, before she took up elite competition in triathlon as an amateur after graduating. She switched to cycling after attending a USA Cycling Talent ID camp in 2008. In November 2015 she was announced as part of the inaugural squad for the  team for the 2016 season.

In 2017 she won Unbound Gravel in Kansas, a race billed as one of the world's top ranked gravel races. She also finished on the podium of the events in 2018 and 2019, even though she had retired as a pro cyclist and no longer rode with a pro team. In 2020, it was cancelled due to COVID-19, but she entered it again in 2021 and placed just outside the top 10. She entered the race again in 2022, but this time she was not targeting a high finish, rather she concentrated on pacing other riders to the finish.

Major results

2010
 3rd Chrono Gatineau
2011
 5th Time trial, Pan American Games
2012
 2nd Chrono des Nations
2013
 2nd Chrono des Nations
2014
 2nd Chrono des Nations
 3rd  Team time trial, UCI Road World Championships
 5th Chrono Champenois-Trophée Européen
2015
 4th Overall BeNe Ladies Tour
1st Stage 3
 5th Overall Tour Femenino de San Luis
1st Stage 6
 5th Overall San Dimas Stage Race

References

External links
 

1985 births
Living people
American female cyclists
People from Solvang, California
21st-century American women